is a high school in Nishinomiya, Hyogo Prefecture, Japan. The school has a sports program which has produced a number of professional baseball players. It was founded as the Hōtoku Business School in Mikage, Kobe, in 1911. The school was strongly affected by the 1995 Kobe earthquake.

Notable alumni

Baseball players
Hiroshi Katayama
Kaito Kozono
Ryusuke Minami, NPB outfielder
Makoto Moriyama
Tomohisa Otani
Masaya Ozaki
Naoki Satoh
Naoyuki Shimizu, NPB pitcher
Katsuki Yamazaki

Rugby players
Mitsutake Hagimoto
Atsushi Hiwasa
Yusuke Niwai

Footballers
Yoshiyuki Okumura
Hidetaka Ubagai
Takuto Yasuoka

Athletics
Koji Ito, track and field sprinter
Kensuke Takezawa, long-distance runner

Sumo wrestlers
Tochinowaka Michihiro
Takakeishō Mitsunobu

Other
Daisuke Hosokawa, swimmer
Mirai Moriyama, actor
Yuichiro Nagashima, martial artist
Tsukasa Nakano, basketball player
Atom Shukugawa, comedian

References

External links
  
Hōtoku Gakuen pamphlet (English language PDF]

High schools in Hyōgo Prefecture
1911 establishments in Japan
Schools in Hyōgo Prefecture